Durak is a card game.

Durak may also refer to:

Durak (surname)
Durak, Iran (disambiguation)
 Durak, Adıyaman, a village in Adıyaman district of Adıyaman Province, Turkey
 Durak, Karaisalı, a village in Karaisalı district of Adana Province, Turkey
 Durak (film), a 2014 Russian crime drama film known as The Fool, written and directed by Yuri Bykov
 Đurak, surname

See also
Durak Zenan (disambiguation)